Softball at the 2008 Summer Olympics in Beijing took place over a ten-day period starting August 12 and culminating in the medal finals on August 21. All games were played at the Fengtai Softball Field. Olympic softball is a women only competition, with men competing in the similar sport of baseball.

This is the most recently contested softball tournament in Olympic history, as the International Olympic Committee voted to remove baseball from the program in the 2012 Olympics. Along with baseball, softball was rejected for inclusion in the 2016 Summer Olympics at the IOC's meeting in October 2009.  However, following a 2016 IOC vote, softball was included for the 2020 Games.

Medalists

Participants

Competition format
Eight teams compete in the Olympic softball tournament, and the competition consists of two rounds.  The preliminary round follows a round robin format, where each of the teams plays all the other teams once.  Following this, the top four teams advance to a page playoff system round consisting of two semifinal games, and finally the bronze and gold medal games.

Qualification
The eight teams in the Olympic softball tournament will qualify through a series of tournaments.  China, as the host nation, is guaranteed one automatic entry.  The top four finalists at the 2006 Softball World Championships will be qualified for the Olympic tournament.  Finally, there will be continental qualifying tournaments for Europe/Africa, Pan-America, and Asia/Oceania, with the winners of each tournament earning a spot in the Olympic tournament.

Qualification schedule

:  Chinese Taipei is the official IOC designation for the state officially referred to as the Republic of China, more commonly known as Taiwan. (See also political status of Taiwan for details.)

Group stage

Preliminary round

The top four teams will advance to the semifinal round.

All times are China Standard Time (UTC+8)

Tiebreaking procedures follow the International Softball Federation's standard procedure for the resolution of ties.

August 12

August 13

August 14

August 15

August 16

August 17

August 18

Medal round
The loser of 1&2 seed game will play the winner of the 3&4 seed game in the bronze medal match. The loser of the bronze medal match wins the bronze medal while the winner goes on to play the winner of the 1&2 seed game for the gold medal in the gold medal match.

Semi finals

Bronze medal match
Winner advances to gold medal match. Loser wins bronze medal.

Gold medal match

References

External links
IOC Softball
International Softball Federation
ISF Olympic Softball
Softball – Official Results Book

2008 Summer Olympics events
2008
2008 in softball
Softball at the 2008 Summer Olympics
Softball competitions in China